John Robinson may refer to:

Academics
John Thomas Romney Robinson (1792–1882), Irish astronomer and physicist
John J. Robinson (1918–1996), historian and author of Born in Blood
John Talbot Robinson (1923–2001), paleontologist
John Alan Robinson (1930–2016), British and American philosopher, mathematician, and early computer scientist
John D. Robinson (psychologist) (1946–2021), psychologist and professor of psychiatry and surgery at Howard University
John Martin Robinson (born 1948), English Officer of Arms and historian
John C. Robinson (biologist) (born 1959), American ornithologist and environmental activist
John R. Robinson, American accountant, professor at the University of Texas at Austin
John Robinson (Australian statistician), professor at Sydney University and 2008 recipient of the Statistical Society of Australia Pitman Medal

Arts and entertainment

Music
John Robinson (organist) (1682–1762), English organist
John Robinson (drummer) (born 1954), American drummer and session musician
Jon-John Robinson (born 1970), American record producer and songwriter
John Robinson (church musician) (born 1983), English organist and choir director

Theatre
John Robinson (English actor) (1908–1979), British actor, known for Quatermass II
John Mark Robinson (born 1948), Canadian-born American designer, director, and actor
John Robinson (American actor) (born 1985), American actor

Visual arts
John Robinson (painter) (1715–1745), English painter
John Henry Robinson (1796–1871), English line engraver
John Charles Robinson (1824–1913), English painter, art collector, and curator
John N. Robinson (1921–1994), African-American artist
John Robinson (sculptor) (1935–2007), British sculptor
John Z. Robinson (born 1953), New Zealand artist
John V. Robinson (born 1960), American photographer, writer, and folklorist

Others artists
John Robinson (circus owner) (1843–1921), American owner of the John Robinson Circus

Military
John Robinson (militiaman) (1735–1805), American Revolutionary War militia officer
John C. Robinson (1817–1897), Union general in the American Civil War
John Robinson (Medal of Honor) (1840–?), U.S. Navy sailor and Medal of Honor recipient
John H. Robinson (Medal of Honor) (1846–1883), Irish Civil War soldier, and Medal of Honor recipient
John Robinson (aviator) (1905–1954), American aviator and activist

Politics and law

Canada
John Robinson (businessman) (1782–1828), merchant and political figure in New Brunswick
Sir John Robinson, 1st Baronet, of Toronto (1791–1863), lawyer, judge and political figure in Upper Canada, kinsman of John Robinson (1650–1723)
his son John Beverley Robinson (1821–1896), Canadian, mayor of Toronto 1856 and Lieutenant Governor of Ontario 1880–1887
John James Robinson (1811–1874), naval officer and political figure in England and New Brunswick
John A. Robinson (1867–1929), Scottish-born educator, journalist and political figure in Newfoundland
John Lyle Robinson (1890–1953), member of the Legislative Assembly of Alberta

United Kingdom
Sir John Robinson, 1st Baronet, of London (1615–1680), Lord Mayor of London, MP for the City of London, Middlesex and Rye
John Robinson (Liskeard MP) (1620–?), English politician in House of Commons in 1660
John Robinson (Harwich MP) (1727–1802), British Member of Parliament for Harwich, 1774–1803
John Roland Robinson, 1st Baron Martonmere (1907–1989), British Conservative politician, Governor of Bermuda, 1964–1972

United States
John Robinson (New York politician) (1654–1734), Member of the New York General Assembly of 1691
John Robinson (burgess) (died 1749), Virginia planter and politician, father of Speaker John Robinson
John Robinson (Virginia politician, born 1705) (1705–1766), Speaker of the House of Burgesses in Virginia 
John McCracken Robinson (1794–1843), U.S. Senator from Illinois
John S. Robinson (governor) (1804–1860), 22nd Governor of Vermont
John L. Robinson (1813–1860), U.S. Representative from Indiana
John Robinson (Virginia politician, born 1822) (1822–1900), African American state senator in Virginia
John Mitchell Robinson (1827–1896), chief judge of the Maryland Court of Appeals
John Buchanan Robinson (1846–1933), U.S. Representative from Pennsylvania
John Seaton Robinson (1856–1903), Nebraska representative
John Robinson (judge) (1880–1951), Chief Justice of the Washington Supreme Court
John H. Robinson (politician) (born 1955), Wisconsin representative
John Robinson (Maine politician) (born 1972), served in the Maine House of Representatives
John Robinson (agriculture commissioner), North Carolina politician
John Robinson (US Marshal) (1838–1917), sheriff of Bennington County, Vermont and US Marshal for the District of Vermont
John Trumbull Robinson, American attorney

Religion
John Robinson (pastor) (1576–1625), English pastor who organized the Mayflower voyage
John Robinson (bishop of London) (1650–1723), English diplomat, Bishop of Bristol, Lord Privy Seal etc.
John Robinson (historian) (1774–1840), English cleric
John Edward Robinson (bishop) (1849–1922), Methodist Episcopal missionary bishop who served in India and Burma
John Robinson (priest) (1852–1916), Dean of Belfast
John Robinson (bishop of Woolwich) (John Arthur Thomas Robinson, 1919–1983), British Bishop of Woolwich
John Robinson (Archdeacon of Bedford) (died 1598), English priest and academic
Ken Robinson (priest) (John Kenneth Robinson, 1936–2020), Anglican priest and Dean of Gibraltar
Sir John Freind Robinson, 1st Baronet, Archdeacon of Armagh

Sports
John Robinson (cricketer, born 1868) (1868–1898), English cricketer
John Robinson (sportsman) (1872–1959), English cricketer and rugby union footballer
John Yate Robinson (1885–1916), British field hockey player
John Robinson (Australian rules footballer) (1891–1966), Australian rules footballer
John Robinson (cricketer, born 1909) (1909–1988), English cricketer
John Robinson (American football coach) (born 1935), American football coach
John Robinson (footballer, born 1971) (born 1971), Welsh footballer

Others
John Robinson (17th century), associate of William Shakespeare
John Robinson (merchant), British merchant in the 19th century; see Juan Manuel Canaveris
John Perry Robinson (1810/11–1865), Superintendent of Nelson Province
John Robinson (engineer) (1823–1902), British locomotive engineer
John Richard Robinson (1828–1903), English journalist
John Robinson (Natal politician) (1839–1903), prime minister of Colony of Natal
John Beverley Robinson (anarchist) (1853–1923), American anarchist author
John Moore Robinson (1855–1934), Canadian explorer
John G. Robinson (1856–1943), railway engineer
John Robinson (brewer) (1895–1978), British brewing executive and local politician
John Edward Robinson (born 1943), American serial killer
John D. Robinson (disability advocate) (born 1968), American author, entrepreneur, and activist
John Robinson (architect), architect of the Isle of Man who designed two Registered Buildings
John Robinson (architect, born 1829), designer of St Lawrence and Mary Magdalene Drinking Fountain, London
John Robinson (estate agent) (died 1927), perpetrator of the Charing Cross Trunk Murder

See also
Jack Robinson (disambiguation)
Jackie Robinson (disambiguation)
John Robison (disambiguation)
Johnny Robinson (disambiguation)
Jon Robinson (disambiguation)
Jonathan Robinson (disambiguation)